= Rico Marumoto =

Japanese singer and songwriter

Rico Marumoto (丸本 莉子, Marumoto Riko, born May 16, 1990 in Hiroshima) is a Japanese singer and songwriter affiliated with Furutachi Project.

In 2015, she was appointed as special envoy for tourism of Kōchi Prefecture.

== Discography ==
=== Studio albums ===
- 2013: Happy Baby★ (ご機嫌ベイベー★, Happī Bebī)
- 2015: Kokoro yohō 〜 ame nochi hare 〜 (ココロ予報〜雨のち晴れ〜, Heart Chi sunny – the forecast – rain)
- 2016: Fushigina yumenouchi (フシギな夢の中, Among the strange dream)

=== Singles ===
- 2012: Kataomoi raidā/ Kokoro yohō (片思いライダー/ココロ予報, Unrequited love rider / heart forecast)
- 2014: Aruite yuke (歩いてゆけ, Walking Yuke)
- 2015: Kokoro yohō (ココロ予報, Heart Forecast)
- 2015: Yasashī uta (やさしいうた, Friendly song)
- 2015: Tsunagu mono (つなぐもの, Connect those)
- 2016: Fushigina yume (フシギな夢, Strange dreams)
